Islam in Togo represents 18% to over a third (33%) of the total population. Islam came to Togo about the same time as it did much of West Africa. The vast majority of Muslims in Togo are Sunni of Maliki school of jurisprudence, some Ahmadiyya and Shia Muslims.

History
Islam was first introduced into West Africa south of the Sahara, across the salt and gold trade routes. Islamicized Berber and Tuareg merchants traveled the trans-Saharan trade routes. As time passed, Muslim clerics and scholars — teaching their beliefs and setting up places of worship along the routes — accompanied traders on their journeys. The Hausa Mande and the Fulani, a traditionally nomadic group, traveled all over West Africa, taking their Muslim beliefs to places such as present-day Guinea, Sierra Leone, and Liberia.

Demographics
Estimates on the number of Muslims in Togo vary depending on the source. The CIA World Factbook puts the figure at 20%. A 2020 projection by the Pew Research Center gives an estimate of 14% of the population or 1,020,000 people.

Organizations
The Federation of Togo Muslims is the largest Muslim organization in the country. It takes care of the Islam-related affairs and denounce extremism.

Notable Muslims
 Mohamed Kader, first Togolese player to score in Fifa World Cup.

References